Daniel Robert Bankhead (May 3, 1920 – May 2, 1976) was the first African American pitcher in Major League Baseball. He played in Negro league baseball for the Birmingham Black Barons and the Memphis Red Sox from 1940 to 1947, then played for the Brooklyn Dodgers from 1947 to 1951.

Early life and Marines 

A native of Birmingham, Alabama, he attended public schools there. His brothers Sam, Fred, Joe, and Garnett all also played baseball in the Negro leagues. During World War II, he served in the United States Marine Corps Reserves from April 1942 to June 1946 and achieved the rank of sergeant. While in the Marines, he played for the Montford Point baseball team and toured the states to raise morale.

Baseball career 

Bankhead had a strong career in Negro league baseball, playing for the Birmingham Black Barons and Memphis Red Sox. Sportswriter Frank 'Fay' Young of the Chicago Defender said he was "among the top three hurlers in the Negro American League," and noted that he was one of ten players being seriously considered by Major League scouts.   Bankhead was signed not long after the Negro Leagues' All-Star game, by Branch Rickey to play in the Brooklyn Dodgers' farm system. Bankhead, who was 24 years old at the time, was also an excellent hitter who was leading the Negro leagues with a .385 batting average when purchased by the Dodgers, hit a home run in his first major league at-bat on August 26, 1947, in Ebbets Field off Fritz Ostermueller of the Pittsburgh Pirates; he also gave up ten hits in  innings pitching in relief that day. He finished the season having pitched in four games for the Dodgers with an earned run average (ERA) of 7.20.

Bankhead was shipped to the minor leagues for the 1948 and 1949 seasons. Pitching for clubs in Nashua, New Hampshire, and St. Paul, Minnesota, in 1948, he recorded 24 wins and six losses. He returned to the Dodgers for the 1950 season, appearing in 41 games, with twelve starts, and finished with nine wins, four losses, and a 5.50 ERA. In 1951, his final year in the majors, he appeared in seven games, losing his only decision, with an ERA of 15.43. After he played his final major league game, Bankhead spent time in the Mexican League, playing with various teams through 1966.

Death 

He died of cancer at a Veterans Administration hospital in Houston, Texas, on May 2, 1976, the day before his 56th birthday.

See also
Home run in first Major League at-bat

References

External links

 and Seamheads

1920 births
1976 deaths
African-American baseball players
American expatriate baseball players in Canada
American expatriate baseball players in Mexico
Baseball players from Alabama
Birmingham Black Barons players
Broncos de León players
Broncos de Reynosa players
Brooklyn Dodgers players
Burials at Houston National Cemetery
Cangrejeros de Santurce (baseball) players
Deaths from cancer in Texas
Drummondville Royals players
Liga de Béisbol Profesional Roberto Clemente pitchers
Major League Baseball pitchers
Memphis Red Sox players
Mexican League baseball pitchers
Montreal Royals players
Nashua Dodgers players
People from Walker County, Alabama
Pericos de Puebla players
Rojos del Águila de Veracruz players
St. Paul Saints (AA) players
Sultanes de Monterrey players
United States Marine Corps reservists
American military sports players
United States Marine Corps personnel of World War II
African Americans in World War II
United States Marine Corps non-commissioned officers